Clive Madande (born 12 April 2000) is a Zimbabwean cricketer. He made his international debut for the Zimbabwe cricket team in June 2022.

Career
He made his first-class debut on 30 March 2021, for Tuskers, in the 2020–21 Logan Cup. He made his Twenty20 debut on 11 April 2021, for Tuskers, in the 2020–21 Zimbabwe Domestic Twenty20 Competition. He made his List A debut on 18 April 2021, for Tuskers, in the 2020–21 Pro50 Championship.

In January 2022, Madande was named in Zimbabwe's One Day International (ODI) squad for their series against Sri Lanka. In June 2022, he was named in Zimbabwe's ODI and Twenty20 International (T20I) squads for their series against Afghanistan. He made his T20I debut on 14 June 2022, for Zimbabwe against Afghanistan. In August 2022, he was named in Zimbabwe's ODI squad, for their series against Bangladesh. He made his ODI debut on 10 August 2022, for Zimbabwe against Bangladesh.

References

External links
 

2000 births
Living people
Zimbabwean cricketers
Zimbabwe Twenty20 International cricketers
Zimbabwe One Day International cricketers
Matabeleland Tuskers cricketers
Place of birth missing (living people)